Andrew F.C. Turpin Dam is dam in the Nyara River, north of Bedford, Eastern Cape, South Africa. It was established in 1949.

See also
List of reservoirs and dams in South Africa
List of rivers in South Africa

References 
 List of South African Dams from the Department of Water Affairs and Forestry (South Africa)

Dams in South Africa
Dams completed in 1949